Ivan Lawrence Blieden (June 23, 1925 – June 6, 1975), known as Larry Blyden, was an American actor, stage producer and director, and game show host. He made his Broadway stage debut in 1948 and went on to appear in numerous productions on and off Broadway. In 1972, he won the Tony Award for Best Featured Actor in a Musical for his performance in the revival of A Funny Thing Happened on the Way to the Forum which he also produced. That same year, he became the host of the syndicated revival version of What's My Line?

At the time of his death, Blyden was slated to host a new game show, Showoffs. He died of injuries sustained in a single-car accident while vacationing in Morocco on June 6, 1975.

Early life
Blyden was born to Adolph and Marian (née Davidson) Blieden in Houston, Texas, and raised in the Jewish faith. As a child, he attended Wharton Elementary School and Sidney Lanier Junior High School. Blyden became interested in acting at a young age and made his stage debut in a production headed by Margo Jones when he was 14 years old.  
After graduating from Lamar High School, Blyden attended Southwestern Louisiana Institute for a year before enlisting in the United States Marine Corps during World War II, rising to the rank of second lieutenant. After leaving the service in 1946, he enrolled at the University of Houston. While in college, Blyden worked as an announcer for KPRC radio and performed at the Alley Theatre and Houston Little Theater. After graduating with a Bachelor of Arts in 1948, Blyden moved to New York City to pursue an acting career.

Career

Stage and films
While in New York, Blyden again worked in radio and studied acting at the Stella Adler Studio of Acting for eighteen months. While starring in a showcase of The Importance of Being Earnest, he was spotted by director Joshua Logan who cast him in a small role in the Broadway production of Mister Roberts. He was then cast in the larger role of "Ensign Pulver", and remained with the production until 1951. His second Broadway role was that of "Schmutz" in the original production of Wish You Wish Here.  In 1958, Blyden replaced Larry Storch as "Sammy Fong" in the out-of-town tryouts for the musical Flower Drum Song. He remained in the role during the show's original Broadway run for which he was nominated for a Tony Award for Best Actor in a Musical. The show was choreographed by his then-wife, Carol Haney. That same year, he appeared in You Can't Take It with You, at Expo 58 (also known as Brussels World's Fair).

In November 1962, Blyden tried his hand at stage directing in the Broadway production of Harold, starring Anthony Perkins and Don Adams. The production closed after twenty performances. In February 1967, Blyden replaced Martin Balsam in the Broadway production of You Know I Can't Hear You When the Water's Running. Blyden's second stage directing effort was the play The Mother Lover, in which he also starred. The production also featured Eileen Heckart and Valerie French and premiered at the Booth Theatre on February 1, 1969. In March 1972, he portrayed the role of "Hysterium" in the revival of A Funny Thing Happened on the Way to the Forum, starring Phil Silvers, which Blyden also produced. He won the Tony Award for Best Featured Actor in a Musical for his work in the play.

In 1974, Blyden appeared as "Dionysos" with the Yale Repertory Theatre in the musical comedy The Frogs, in New Haven, Connecticut. The play was written by Burt Shevelove, and based on a play written by Aristophanes in 405 B.C. The play's music and lyrics were composed by Stephen Sondheim. Blyden's final stage role was that of "Sidney" in Alan Ayckbourn's comedy Absurd Person Singular, for which he was nominated for a Drama Desk Award for Outstanding Featured Actor in a Play and a Tony Award for Best Actor in a Play. He remained with the production for 250 performances.

Over the course of his career, Blyden appeared in three feature films. He made his film debut in a supporting role in the 1957 drama The Bachelor Party, starring Don Murray. He also had supporting roles in Kiss Them for Me (1957) and On a Clear Day You Can See Forever (1970).

Television

In addition to stage and occasional film work, Blyden also appeared in guest spots for television shows. In the 1950s, he made guest performances on several dramatic anthology shows including Playhouse 90, Omnibus, The Loretta Young Show and The United States Steel Hour. In May 1955, CBS announced that Blyden was set to star opposite Nita Talbot in the sitcom Joe and Mabel. The series, which was based on the radio series of the same name that had aired on the NBC Red Network from February 1941 to September 1942, was scheduled to premiere on September 20, 1955. Production began that summer but was hampered by the Screen Actors Guild strike that began on August 5, 1955. Although the strike lasted just ten days, production on the series ceased. Production eventually resumed but the series was plagued with various issues and, upon being previewed for critics, was poorly received. CBS eventually decided to burn off the series' thirteen completed episodes during the summer of 1956 after which it was canceled.

After the cancellation of Joe and Mabel, Blyden returned to stage work (replacing Ray Walston in the Philadelphia and Broadway runs of Who Was That Lady I Saw You With? and Flower Drum Song). He returned to television in 1959 as "Sammy Glick" in the television adaptation of Budd Schulberg's 1941 novel What Makes Sammy Run? The two-part special aired on the NBC Sunday Showcase on September 27 and October 4, 1959, and also starred John Forsythe, Dina Merrill and Barbara Rush.

In the early 1960s, Blyden returned to television with guest starring roles in two episodes of The Twilight Zone: "A Nice Place to Visit" in April 1960 and "Showdown with Rance McGrew" in February 1962 in which he starred as the title character. In 1963, Blyden was cast to star in a second sitcom, NBC's Harry's Girls. Produced by MGM Television, the series was an adaptation of the Robert E. Sherwood play Idiot's Delight, with Blyden starring as Harry, a vaudeville style performer constantly getting into trouble and falling in love. The series received a great deal of publicity before it aired because it was being filmed on location in Europe (interiors were filmed at the Victorine Studios in France while exteriors were shot on location in Rome, Paris and other European locations). Upon its debut, Harry's Girls was also not well received and was canceled after one season. For the remainder of the decade, Blyden continued with guest roles on television including spots on Alfred Hitchcock Presents, The Defenders,  The Fugitive, and The Man from U.N.C.L.E.

In the late 1960s, Blyden began working as a game show host and master of ceremonies starting with Personality in June 1967. In 1969, he hosted You're Putting Me On and The Movie Game. In 1972, Blyden took over hosting duties for the syndicated revival of the game show What's My Line? Blyden remained the show's host until it was canceled in 1975.  Blyden also made a week of appearances on the CBS game show Match Game '74.

In the weeks before his death, Blyden was involved in several major projects. He co-hosted the 29th Tony Awards telecast that aired on ABC on April 20, 1975. On May 2, Blyden reprised his role as Ensign Pulver opposite Henry Fonda at a gala tribute to director Joshua Logan at Broadway's Imperial Theatre (which was recorded and eventually released on a privately distributed LP album). He also narrated a segment of CBS's Bicentennial Minute which aired during primetime the evening of May 30.

Personal life
Blyden married actress and dancer Carol Haney on April 17, 1955, in Las Vegas. The couple had two children: Joshua and Ellen Rachel. Blyden and Haney were divorced in 1962.

During their marriage, Blyden and Haney purchased the historic Achenbach House in Saddle River, New Jersey, which they believed to be haunted by the spirit of its builder. After Haney's death in 1964, Blyden inherited the home and became convinced that her spirit was haunting the house. Blyden later told a friend that in the months after Haney's death, the house was filled with the smell of brownies baking which had been Haney's favorite. Blyden told his friend that after he yelled at Haney to leave him alone, the smell instantly vanished. 
The house was later sold to tour operator Mario Perillo and was destroyed by fire in 2004.

Death
On May 6, 1975, Blyden left the production of Absurd Person Singular after he was hired to host a new game show entitled Showoffs. He videotaped the pilot episode on May 24. Before production was set to begin, Blyden was granted a two-week vacation and decided to fly to Marrakesh, Morocco. While he was driving near Agadir on May 31, Blyden's rental car reportedly went off the road and overturned. According to Blyden's manager, Blyden suffered injuries to the chest, head and abdomen. He underwent surgery, but died of his injuries on June 6, 1975. Blyden's body was flown back to the United States on June 13. A memorial was held on June 20, after which he was buried at Forest Park Lawndale Cemetery in Houston.

Broadway appearances

Filmography

Notes

Further reading

External links
 
 
 Discography at SonyBMG Masterworks
 
 

1925 births
1975 deaths
20th-century American male actors
American game show hosts
American male film actors
American male musical theatre actors
American male stage actors
American male television actors
United States Marine Corps personnel of World War II
American theatre directors
American theatre managers and producers
Jewish American male actors
Male actors from Houston
People from Saddle River, New Jersey
Road incident deaths in Morocco
Stella Adler Studio of Acting alumni
Tony Award winners
United States Marine Corps officers
University of Louisiana at Lafayette alumni
University of Houston alumni
20th-century American businesspeople
20th-century American singers
20th-century American male singers
20th-century American Jews
Military personnel from New Jersey